Demographics of Korea refers to the demographic examination of Korea, a region in Northeast Asia.

Specific examinations include:
 Demographics of South Korea
 Demographics of North Korea

See also
 Koreans, the Korean people, an East Asian ethnic group living in the Korean Peninsula